Final Exam is a 1978 album by Loudon Wainwright III. It was re-released on Telarc in 2006 at the time of his European tour as a double-disk album, coupled with his 1976 album T Shirt.

The backing band were Slow Train; consisting of John Crowder, Richard Crooks, Ron Getman, Glen Mitchell and Stephen Tubin.

At this point in his career, Wainwright was including a lot of electric and rockier songs. After poor reviews of T-Shirt and Final Exam the latter became his last studio album for five years. He emerged, reborn as an acoustic writer backed by acoustic folk/rock musicians. He disowned Final Exam in an Australian radio interview in the early 1990s, but changed his mind and embraced it (and T-Shirt) according to the liner notes to the 2006 release.

Track listing
All tracks composed by Loudon Wainwright III

"Final Exam"
"Mr. Guilty"
"Penpal Blues"
"Golfin' Blues"
"The Heckler"
"Natural Disaster"
"Fear with Flying"
"Heaven and Mud"
"Two-song Set"
"Pretty Little Martha"
"Watch Me Rock, I'm Over Thirty"

Personnel
Loudon Wainwright III - guitar, vocals
Slow Train
Ron Getman - steel guitar, guitar, vocals
John Crowder - bass, vocals
Glen Mitchell - keyboards, vocals
Stephen Tubin - keyboards
Richard Crooks - drums, percussion
with:
Arlen Roth - slide guitar
John Hall - guitar
Eric Weissberg - banjo
Errol "Crusher" Bennett - percussion
Kenny Kosek - violin
John Lissauer - clarinet
Hugh McCracken - guitar
Larry Packer - violin
The Roches - backing vocals
Technical
Harvey Hoffman - recording and mixing engineer
Peter Cunningham - cover photography

Release history
LP: Arista AB4173 (U.S.)
LP: Arista SPART1042 (UK)
LP: Poopik Productions AB4173 (Europe)

References

Loudon Wainwright III albums
1978 albums
Arista Records albums
Albums produced by John Lissauer